Raging Bull is a 1980 film about boxer Jake LaMotta.

Raging Bull or The Raging Bull may also refer to:

Nickname or ring name
 Jake LaMotta (1922–2017), American former world champion boxer
 Darren Corbett (born 1972), boxer from Northern Ireland
 Gorden Tallis (born 1973), Australian rugby league player 
 Phil Vickery (rugby union) (born 1976), English former rugby union player
 Enrico Villanueva (born 1980), Filipino basketball player
 ring name of Manny Fernandez (wrestler) (born 1954), professional wrestler

Other uses
 HMM-261, a United States Marine Corps helicopter squadron known as the Raging Bulls
 Raging Bull: My Story, LaMotta's 1970 memoir and the basis for the 1980 film
 Raging Bull (roller coaster), a roller-coaster at Six Flags Great America in Gurnee, Illinois
 Taurus Raging Bull, a revolver
 "Raging Bull" (Phil of the Future episode)
 RagingBull.com, a financial website
 "Raging Bull", a 2014 song by ATB

See also
 Easy Riders, Raging Bulls, a 1998 book

Lists of people by nickname